Bulloo Downs is a rural locality in the Shire of Bulloo, Queensland, Australia.

On 17 April 2020 the Queensland Government reorganised the nine localities in the Shire, resulting in six localities. It included Bulloo Downs losing a portion of its western land to the locality of Cameron Corner while gaining a small portion from the south of the former Bullawarra (the rest being incorporated into Thargomindah).

History 
One group of the Burke and Wills expedition camped in Bulloo Downs in 1861; three men from the group died and were buried there. This expedition provided information about the suitability of the land for pastoral purposes and the first recorded settlement was Bulloo Downs Station taken up by Jones, Sullivan and Molesworth Green in 1864.

The locality takes its name from the Bulloo Downs Station. Bulloo is an Aboriginal word from the Kamilaroi language meaning slow. 

On 17 April 2020 the Queensland Government reorganised the nine localities in the Shire, resulting in six localities. It included Bulloo Downs losing a small portion of its western land to the locality of Cameron Corner while gaining a small portion from the south of the former Bullawarra (the rest being incorporated into Thargomindah).

Heritage listings 
Bulloo Downs has a number of heritage-listed sites, including:
 Bulloo River: Dr Ludwig Becker's Grave

References

External links 

Shire of Bulloo
Localities in Queensland